The cast of the television series MythBusters performs experiments to verify or debunk urban legends, old wives' tales, and the like. This is a list of the various myths tested on the show, as well as the results of the experiments (the myth is Busted, Plausible, or Confirmed).

Episode overview

Episode 70 – "Hindenberg Mystery" 
 Original air date: January 10, 2007

Hindenburg Mystery

Crocodile Zig Zags

Episode 71 – "Pirate Special" 
 Original air date: January 17, 2007

This was a double-length episode.

Cannonball vs. Shrapnel

Eye Patch

Knife Sail

Rum: Stain Remover?

Episode 72 – "Underwater Car" 
 Original air date: January 24, 2007

Underwater Car 
According to the American Automobile Association, an estimated 11,000 vehicles crashed into bodies of water in one year. The MythBusters tested various methods of escaping a sinking car, in this case a Ford Taurus.

Having confirmed the myth, Adam and Jamie expanded on the myth to determine in what situations and which methods of escaping the car are feasible.

A person can escape a car that has fallen into the water...

They also proved that breaking the window is a viable way to escape a sinking car, if one has a suitable tool. Though breaking the window quickly floods the interior, Adam only has to hold his breath for a few seconds before climbing through the simulated "broken window" and surfacing. A person can open a window in a submerged car by...

Seven Folds

Episode 73 – "Speed Cameras" 
 Original air date: March 7, 2007

Speed Cameras
The MythBusters tested whether a speed camera...

The unofficial (Jamie Hyneman) test...

Exploding Nitro Patches 
Nitroglycerin is useful in treating heart and blood conditions, but is also an unstable explosive. The Build Team tested the efficacy of labels warning not to use a defibrillator before removing any nitroglycerin patches.

Episode 74 – "Dog Myths" 
 Original air date: March 14, 2007

Old Dogs, New Tricks 
Following the old saying, Jamie and Adam see if they can teach an old dog new tricks.

Beat the Guard Dog 
The Build Team tries to distract and get around a guard dog (in this case, a German Shepherd named Eewan) by...
 

Afterwards, the team tried to invent ways to get past Eewan.

Overall, while a few methods managed to work, the guard dogs can be specifically trained to ignore certain distractions. Thus, overall, this myth was considered only plausible.

Foil the Bloodhound 
The MythBusters see what it takes to shake a scent hound.

A Bloodhound can be deterred by...

Conclusion

Episode 75 – "More Myths Revisited" 
 Original air date: March 21, 2007
This is the sixth episode in which earlier myths are retested.

The Mad Trombonist

Sniper Scope

Finger in a Barrel

Hammer vs. Hammer

Episode 76 – "Voice Flame Extinguisher" 
 Original air date: April 11, 2007

Voice Flame Extinguisher

Hypnosis

Episode 77 – "Birds in a Truck" 
 Original air date: April 18, 2007

Birds in a Truck

Bifurcated Boat

Episode 78 – "Walking on Water" 
 Original air date: April 25, 2007

The MythBusters test various ninja-related myths.

Walking on Water

Catching an Arrow

Catching a Sword

Episode 79 – "Western Myths" 
 Original air date: May 30, 2007

Shooting a Hat

Lockpick of Death

Old Western Jailbreak

Lone Ranger's Silver Bullets

Episode 80 – "Big Rig Myths" 
 Original air date: June 6, 2007

This was the first episode in which all myths shown on television (excluding the special website-only myth, which was Plausible) were confirmed.

Exploding Tire of Death

Drafting For Money

Knight Rider Ramp

Cyclists Drafting a Big Rig

Episode 81 – "Grenades and Guts" 
 Original air date: June 13, 2007

Self Hypnosis 
The Build Team tested whether self-hypnosis could...

Though the Build Team only tested self-hypnosis in several specific cases, because of the results, they deemed that the overall myth of self-hypnosis was busted.

Diet Coke & Mentos II: Exploding Stomach

Hand Grenade Hero 
This myth was based on various Hollywood depictions of how heroes would dispose of triggered grenades to save their comrades. The MythBusters tested whether a hero could save his buddies by...

Before the above experiments, Adam tested a mini myth:

Episode 82 – "Snow Special" 
 Original air date: June 20, 2007

The following myths state that an avalanche can be caused by...

Despite the "busted" designation, Jamie emphasized that avalanches are "finicky beasts" and cases of skiers unintentionally setting them off have been noted. Therefore, it is impossible to tell exactly what will trigger an avalanche.

Frozen Tongue

Driving on Ice

Episode 83 – "Baseball Myths" 
 Original air date: August 8, 2007
This episode featured Roger Clemens as a guest star in a short segment explaining the physics behind different pitches.

Corked Bat

Humid Balls

Rising Fastball

The Slide

Hitting the Hide Off a Ball

Episode 84 – "Viewers' Special" 
 Original air date: August 15, 2007
Viewers will pick myths they think need to be tested and the MythBusters will pick the best to test.

Eye-Popping Sneeze

Stopping a Car in Reverse

Killer Butts

Car Remote Capers

Car Explosion

Stopping a Blade
This was an online-only special. The Build Team also tested if one could prevent an opponent's sword from piercing the chest with...

Episode 85 – "Red Rag to a Bull" 
 Original air date: August 22, 2007

Hot Bullets 
Jamie and Adam investigated myths inspired by reports of gun owners attempting to use their ovens to store guns and ammunition since a proper gun cabinet isn't available - and then running into trouble if they forgot to remove the guns and ammo before using the oven.

Campfire Chaos 
While their fire that they used to test bullets on an open fire was still going, Adam and Jamie took the opportunity to test the danger and lethality of other containers or pressure vessels when placed into a fire.

Red Rag to a Bull

Bull in a China Shop

Episode 86 – "Superhero Hour" 
 Original air date: August 29, 2007

Grappling Hook

Ring Punch

Phone Booth Quick Change

Vehicle Grappling Hook

Episode 87 – "Myth Revolution" 
 Original air date: September 5, 2007

The MythBusters revisit several past myths with a special twist. This time, they are exploring several side myths that they had missed while testing the main myths.

Swatting a Bullet

Thumbs Over the Airbag

Exploding RFID Tags

Breathing Through a Tire

Beating the Speed Camera 

Snow Rescue

Episode 88 – "Trailblazers" 
 Original air date: October 31, 2007

Adam and Jamie get on the trail of some flammable Hollywood fables while Kari, Grant and Tory break out the defibrillator for some electrifying action.

Vapor Trail

Gunpowder Keg

Shocking Defibrillator 
In these two myths, the team tests whether a defibrillator can burn someone if the electricity arcs with...

Episode 89 – "Exploding Water Heater" 
 Original air date: November 7, 2007

Exploding Water Heater

Blue Jean Myths 
The Build team tested two myths that revolved around denim jeans.

Episode 90 – "Special Supersized Myths" 
 Original air date: November 14, 2007
This episode was "dedicated to Mr. Wizard", Don Herbert, known for his Mr. Wizard science programs, which ran from 1951 to 1990. It ran for 2 hours.

Supersize Shark 
The MythBusters tested the following myths involving great white sharks.

Supersize Jet Taxi 
This is a retest of the old Jet Taxi myth, because the MythBusters were unable to obtain a full-sized plane and fans both complaining and mentioning the BBC automotive show Top Gear test of the myth (which was acknowledged ambiguously by Jamie referencing a "British TV show"). This time, the Build Team tests if the engines of a Boeing 747 can flip:

Supersize Rocket Car 
This is a spinoff from a previous myth, the JATO Rocket Car. This time, the MythBusters are testing for the results, not the circumstances. Former Build Team member Scottie Chapman makes an appearance in this segment.

Supersize Cruise Ship Waterskiing

Episode 91 – "Shooting Fish in a Barrel" 
 Original air date: November 21, 2007

Shooting Fish in a Barrel

Hot Chili Cures 
The Build Team wolfs down various spicy peppers to test whether a hot chili mouth can be cured by...

Elephants Scared of Mice

Episode 92 – "Pirates 2" 
 Original air date: November 28, 2007

In this episode, the MythBusters test several myths based on scenes from the film Pirates of the Caribbean: The Curse of the Black Pearl and other pirate movies.

Rowboat Submarine

Buried in Sand

Cannonball Chaos 
Adam and Jamie tested several cannonball myths involving improvised cannon ammunition and whether they are lethal or not. Using a Civil War-era cannon nicknamed "Old Moses" that had been used to help test "Cannonball vs. Shrapnel" on the first Pirate Special, the MythBusters fired various improvised materials that would be found on a period pirate ship at dead pigs to test their lethality. Some of these improvised cannonballs include...

MacGyver Mini Myth 
During the commercial break, the MythBusters tested this myth as a promo for their upcoming MacGyver special.

Episode 93 – "Confederate Steam Gun" 
 Original air date: December 5, 2007

Steam Powered Machine Gun

Beating the Lie Detector

MacGyver Mini Myth 
During the commercial break, the MythBusters tested this myth as a promo for their upcoming MacGyver special.

Episode 94 – "Airplane Hour" 
 Original air date: December 12, 2007

Talked into Landing

Point Break Trilogy 
The MythBusters test three skydiving myths based on a scene in the film Point Break.

MacGyver Mini Myth 
During the commercial break, the MythBusters tested this myth as a promo for their upcoming MacGyver special.

References 

    
   7.handheld

External links 

 MythBusters Official site
 

2007 American television seasons
2007